Eigersund is a municipality in Rogaland county, Norway. It is in the traditional district of Dalane. The administrative centre of the municipality is the town of Egersund. The town was known for its pottery factory (closed in 1979) and it is among Norway's biggest fishing ports. The villages of Helleland, Hellvik, and Hestnes are also in Eigersund.

The island of Eigerøya lies just off shore from Egersund. The island has several well-known businesses and attractions including the Eigerøy war memorial from World War II.

The  municipality is the 228th largest by area out of the 356 municipalities in Norway. Eigersund is the 82nd most populous municipality in Norway with a population of 14,860.

General information

The rural parish surrounding the town of Egersund was established as the municipality of Egersund landdisstrikt (Egersund rural district) on 1 January 1838 (see formannskapsdistrikt law). In 1839, the northwestern district of Augne (population: 825) was separated to form its own municipality. On 12 December 1868, a small area of Eigersund municipality (population: 41) was transferred to neighboring Sokndal. In 1947, an area of Eigersund immediately surrounding the town of Egersund (population: 515) was transferred to the town of Egersund and another area in Sokndal (population: 7) was transferred to Eigersund.

During the 1960s, there were many municipal mergers in Norway due to the work of the Schei Committee. On 1 January 1965, the town of Egersund (population: 3,787) was merged with the surrounding municipalities of Eigersund (population: 4,664), Helleland (population: 851), and the Gyadalen and Grøsfjel areas of Heskestad (population: 114). The new municipality was also called Eigersund. On 1 January 1967, the Tjørn farm (population: 10) was transferred from Eigersund to Sokndal.

Name
The Old Norse form of the name was Eikundarsund. The first element is the genitive case of the name of the island of Eikund (now Eigerøya) and the last element is sund which means "strait" or "sound". The first element in the name of the island is eik which means "oak" and the last element is the suffix -und which means "plentiful of" (i.e. "the island covered with oak trees").

"Egersund" vs. "Eigersund"
The form of the name spelled without the diphthong [ei] (Egersund) is the Danish language form of the name which is still preserved in the name of the town Egersund, but the municipality name is spelled using the Norwegian language form.

Coat of arms
The coat of arms was granted on 20 October 1972. The arms show a gold/yellow oak leaf on a green background. The arms are partly a canting since the name is supposedly derived from Eikundarsund and eik means oak. Oaks are also very common in the municipality.

Churches
The Church of Norway has three parishes within the municipality of Eigersund. It is part of the Dalane prosti (deanery) in the Diocese of Stavanger.

History
The place is mentioned in Snorri Sturluson's writings. Later, Christian IV set up a battery there.

Government
All municipalities in Norway, including Eigersund, are responsible for primary education (through 10th grade), outpatient health services, senior citizen services, unemployment and other social services, zoning, economic development, and municipal roads. The municipality is governed by a municipal council of elected representatives, which in turn elect a mayor.  The municipality falls under the Sør-Rogaland District Court and the Gulating Court of Appeal.

Municipal council
The municipal council of Eigersund is made up of 31 representatives that are elected to four year terms. Currently, the party breakdown is as follows:

Geography
Eigersund extends from the North Sea coast to the border of Agder county. It borders the municipalities of Hå and Bjerkreim to the north and Sokndal to the south. The municipality is centered on the town of Egersund, and includes the island of Eigerøya. The landscape includes many rivers and lakes, as well as woods and several barren rocky and heather-clad moors. The lakes Grøsfjellvatnet, Eiavatnet, Nodlandsvatnet, and Teksevatnet lie in the municipality.

Eigerøya
Eigerøya is an island off the coast of Egersund. The island is connected to the mainland over Eigerøy bridge, which was completed in 1951. The island's coastline is characterized by a number of small bays, as well as Lundarviga. Eigerøya is divided almost in two of the large bay of Lundarviga. The island is surrounded by a number of small islets. Eigerøy Lighthouse and Vibberodden Lighthouse are both located along the shores of Eigerøya.

Climate

Transportation
European route E39 runs through the municipality, passing the village of Helleland. The Sørlandet Line runs through the municipality, stopping at Egersund Station and Hellvik Station.

Notable people 

 Michael Birkeland (1830 in Eigersund – 1896) an historian, civil servant and politician
 Peter C. Assersen (1839 in Egersund – 1906) civil engineer and Rear Admiral in US Navy
 Bernt B. Lomeland (1836 in Helleland – 1900) a school teacher and lay minister
 Elisabeth Fedde (1850-1921) a Lutheran Deaconess, lived in Egersund from 1895
 Anna Bugge (1862 in Egersund – 1928) a Norwegian & Swedish feminist, lawyer, diplomat and politician
 Jacob Thorkelson (1876 in Egersund – 1945) US Congressman from Montana
 Jack Nielsen (1896 in Egersund – 1981) Norwegian tennis player, six-time national champion
 Paulus Svendsen (1904 in Egersund – 1989) literary historian, wrote biographies of Western philosophers
 Thorbjørn Feyling (1907 in Egersund – 1985) a ceramist with Stavangerflint AS
 Johnny Stenberg (born 1925 in Eigersund - 1990) politician, Mayor of Meråker, 1966-1973
 John Olav Larssen (1927 in Hellvik – 2009) an evangelical preacher and missionary
 Gunnar Kvassheim (born 1953 in Eigersund) a Norwegian journalist and politician
 Bengt Sæternes (born 1975 in Egersund) a former footballer with 478 club caps and 7 for Norway

References

External links

Municipal fact sheet from Statistics Norway 

 
Municipalities of Rogaland
1838 establishments in Norway